The huge moth family Noctuidae contains the following genera:

A B C D E F G H I J K L M N O P Q R S T U V W X Y Z

Kakopoda
Kallitrichia
Kalmina
Karana
Kenguichardia
Kenrickodes
Khadira
Klappericola
Klugeana
Knappia
Kobestelia
Kocakina
Koehleramia
Koffoleania
Kohlera
Kollariana
Koptoplax
Koraia
Koyaga
Krugia
Kumasia
Kuruschia
Kyneria

References 

 Natural History Museum Lepidoptera genus database

 
Noctuid genera K